Tingena clarkei is a species of moth in the family Oecophoridae. It is endemic to New Zealand and has been observed in the North and South Island. This species is on the wing from November until February and inhabits open scrubland or native forest. This species is similar in appearance to Trachypepla photinella.

Taxonomy 

This species was first described by Alfred Philpott in 1928 using specimens collected by C. E. Clarke in Waikaraka Valley and Kauri Gully, Auckland in January, and named Borkhausenia clarkei. George Hudson discussed this species under the name B. clarkei in his 1939 publication A supplement to the butterflies and moths of New Zealand. In 1988 J. S. Dugdale placed this species in the genus Tingena. The male holotype specimen, collected in Kauri Gully, Birkenhead, is held at the Auckland Museum.

Description 

Philpott described this species as follows:
This species can be confused with Trachypepla photinella.

Distribution

This species is endemic to New Zealand. Other than the type locality of Kauri Gully, this species has been collected near Mangamuka in Northland, and Albany, north of Auckland. This species has also been observed in Otago.

Behaviour and habitat 
This species is on the wing from November until February and inhabits open scrubland or native forest.

References

Oecophoridae
Moths of New Zealand
Moths described in 1928
Endemic fauna of New Zealand
Taxa named by Alfred Philpott
Endemic moths of New Zealand